Ole Christian Iversen (born 1 August 1946) is a Norwegian speed skater. He was born in Lillehammer and represented the club Oslo IL. He competed in the 500 m at the 1972 Winter Olympics in Sapporo.

References

External links

1946 births
Living people
Sportspeople from Lillehammer
Norwegian male speed skaters
Olympic speed skaters of Norway
Speed skaters at the 1972 Winter Olympics
Universiade medalists in speed skating
Universiade gold medalists for Norway
Competitors at the 1972 Winter Universiade
20th-century Norwegian people